Peasley is a surname. Notable people with the surname include:
Aaron Peasley (1775-1837), American button maker
Cheryl Peasley (born 1951), Australian Olympic sprinter
Ed Peasley (born c. 1935), American football player and coach
Marv Peasley (1889-1948), American baseball player
Ralph Erksine Peasley (1866-1948), American sea captain on whom fictional captain Matt Peasley is based

Fictional characters
Prince Peasley, character in videogame Mario & Luigi: Superstar Saga
Matt Peasley, sea captain in writings of Peter B. Kyne, based on Ralph Erksine Peasley

See also
Paisley (name)
Peisley
Peasley Cross, area of Sutton, St Helen's, Lancashire, England
Peasley Cross railway station